Don Olsen kommer til byen is a 1964 Danish comedy film directed by Anker Sørensen. The film stars Dirch Passer.

Cast
Dirch Passer
Buster Larsen
Bodil Udsen
Birgitte Price
Marguerite Viby
Bendt Rothe
Otto Brandenburg
Daimi Larsen
Karl Stegger
Christian Arhoff
Arthur Jensen
Valsø Holm
Kai Holm
Ejner Federspiel
Bjørn Spiro
Holger Vistisen
Carl Ottosen
Jørgen Weel
Gunnar Strømvad
Gunnar Lemvigh
Lotte Tarp
Ebba Amfeldt
Aage Winther-Jørgensen
Gerda Madsen
Lili Heglund
Jytte Abildstrøm
Avi Sagild
Ole Monty
Hans W. Petersen
Preben Kaas
Jørgen Ryg
Ebbe Langberg
Ove Sprogøe
Preben Mahrt
Grethe Sønck
Inger Stender

External links
 

1960s Danish-language films
1964 films
1964 comedy films
Danish comedy films